Gorilla Glass is a brand of chemically strengthened glass developed and manufactured by Corning, now in its eighth generation. Designed to be thin, light and damage-resistant, the glass gains its surface strength, ability to contain flaws, and crack-resistance by being immersed in a hot, potassium-salt, ion-exchange bath.

The alkali-aluminosilicate sheet glass is used primarily as cover glass for portable electronic devices, including mobile phones, smartwatches, portable media players, portable computer displays, and television screens. It is manufactured in Harrodsburg, Kentucky; in Asan, South Korea; and in Taiwan. In October 2017, some five billion devices globally contained Gorilla Glass. While dominating its market, Gorilla Glass faces varying competition from close equivalents, including AGC Inc.'s Dragontrail and Schott AG's Xensation and synthetic sapphire.

Background and development 
Corning experimented with chemically strengthened glass in 1960 as part of a "Project Muscle" initiative. Within a few years they had developed a "muscled glass" marketed  as Chemcor. The product was used until the early 1990s, in commercial and industrial applications, including automotive, aviation and pharmaceutical uses, notably in approximately one hundred 1968, Dodge Dart and Plymouth Barracuda racing cars, where minimizing the vehicle's weight was essential.

Experimentation was revived in 2005, investigating whether the glass could be made thin enough for use in consumer electronics. Although not called Gorilla Glass at the time, it was brought into commercial use with the launch of the new iPhone in June 2007. The iPhone that Steve Jobs revealed in January 2007, still featured a plastic display. The day after he held up the plastic iPhone on stage, Jobs complained about scratches that had developed on the phone's display after carrying it around in his pocket. Apple then contacted Corning and asked for a thin, toughened glass to be used in its new phone. The scratch-resistant glass that shipped on the first-generation iPhone would eventually come to be known as Gorilla Glass, officially introduced in February 2008. Corning further developed the material for a variety of smartphones and other consumer electronics devices for a range of companies.

Corning markets the material's primary properties as its high scratch-resistance (protective coating) and its hardness (with a Vickers hardness test rating of 622 to 701), which allows the glass to be thin without being fragile. The glass can be recycled.

In December 2015, Ford Motor Company announced that it would be the first to use the material for a windshield and rear window on its Ford GT sports car beginning in 2016; it later spread to mainstream models such as the Ford F-150 and Jeep Wrangler.

Manufacture 
During its manufacture, the glass is toughened by ion exchange. The larger ions occupy more volume and thereby create a surface layer of high residual compressive stress, giving the glass surface increased strength, ability to contain flaws, and overall crack-resistance, making it resistant to damage from everyday use.

Generations 

The first generation of Gorilla Glass was introduced on February 8, 2008. By 2010, the glass had been used in approximately 20% of mobile handsets worldwide, about 200 million units.

The second generation, called "Gorilla Glass 2", was introduced on January 9, 2012. It is 20% thinner than the original Gorilla Glass. In October 2012, Corning announced that over one billion mobile devices used Gorilla Glass.

Gorilla Glass 3 was introduced at CES 2013 on January 7. According to Corning, the material is up to three times more scratch-resistant than the previous version, with enhanced ability to resist deep scratches that typically weaken glass. Promotional material for Gorilla Glass 3 claims that it is 40% more scratch-resistant, in addition to being more flexible. The design of Gorilla Glass 3 was Corning's first use of atomic-scale modeling before the material was melted in laboratories, with the prediction of the optimal composition obtained through the application of rigidity theory. The first phone to use Gorilla Glass 3 was the Samsung Galaxy S4 in 2013.

When Gorilla Glass 3 was announced, Corning indicated that areas for future improvements included reducing reflectivity and susceptibility to fingerprint smudges, and changing surface treatments and the way the glass is finished. Antimicrobial Gorilla Glass, with antibacterial ionic silver incorporated into its surface, was introduced and demonstrated at CES in January 2014.

Gorilla Glass 4 was introduced on November 20, 2014. It has better damage resistance and capability to be made thinner with the same performance as its predecessor. It was first used on the Samsung Galaxy Alpha in 2014.

Gorilla Glass 5 was introduced on July 20, 2016. It offers better resistance to cracking from drops and was first used on the Samsung Galaxy Note 7 in 2016.

Gorilla Glass SR+ was introduced on August 30, 2016. It was designed for wearable mobile devices, focusing on toughness, scratch resistance and optical clarity. It was first used on the Samsung Gear S3 smartwatch in 2016.

Gorilla Glass 6 was introduced on July 18, 2018. It has the scratch resistance of Gorilla Glass 5, but is designed to withstand multiple drops from even greater heights. It was first used on the Samsung Galaxy S10 in 2019.

Gorilla Glass DX and DX+ were introduced on July 18, 2018, following the launch of Gorilla Glass 6. An extension of Gorilla Glass SR+, Gorilla Glass DX features enhanced antireflective optics with the same scratch resistance of Gorilla Glass, while Gorilla Glass DX+ provides enhanced antireflective optics with superior scratch resistance. While primarily intended for wearable mobile devices, developments were underway to adapt these new glass composites to larger form-factor devices. Gorilla Glass DX+ was first used on the Samsung Galaxy Watch in 2018.

Gorilla Glass Victus was introduced on July 23, 2020. As the successor to Gorilla Glass 6, it improves both drop and scratch performance and is claimed by Corning to be twice as scratch resistant as its predecessor. It was first used on the Samsung Galaxy Note 20 Ultra in 2020.

In July 2021, Corning announced that they will bring its Gorilla Glass DX and DX+ glass composites to cover smartphone camera lenses and said that Samsung would be the first customer to adopt them for their smartphone cameras. The first Samsung phones to use Gorilla Glass DX protection for the cameras were the Galaxy Z Fold 3 and the Galaxy Z Flip 3 in 2021.

Gorilla Glass Victus 2 was introduced on November 30, 2022. The second-generation Victus has a new composition for improved drop performance on rough surfaces like concrete. In terms of scratch resistance, it is said to be similar to its predecessor. It was first used on the Samsung Galaxy S23 series in 2023.

Related products 
On October 26, 2011, Corning announced the commercial launch of Lotus Glass, designed for OLED and next-generation LCD displays. The intrinsic thermal consistency of Lotus Glass allows it to retain its shape and quality during high-temperature processing. Decreased compaction and variation during the crystallization and activation step further reduce stress and distortions to the substrate. This enables tighter design rules in advanced backplanes for higher resolution and faster response time. According to Corning, Gorilla Glass is specifically a cover glass for the exterior of display devices while Lotus Glass is designed as a glass substrate to be used within liquid crystal display panels. In other words, a single product could incorporate both Gorilla Glass and Lotus Glass. On February 2, 2012, Corning Incorporated and Samsung Mobile Display Co., Ltd. signed an agreement to establish a new equity venture for the manufacture of specialty glass substrates for the OLED device market in Korea. The joint venture is based on Lotus Glass. Lotus XT Glass became available in 2013.

In 2012, Corning introduced Willow Glass, a flexible glass based on borosilicate glass, launched for use as a display substrate.

See also 

 Overflow downdraw method
 Tempered glass

References

External links 
 
 Lotus Glass product page at Corning
 

American brands
American inventions
Corning Inc.
Glass applications
Glass engineering and science
Glass trademarks and brands
Materials science